Halgerda aurantiomaculata is a species of sea slug, a dorid nudibranch, shell-less marine gastropod mollusks in the family Discodorididae.

Distribution
Described from North-West Islet, Capricorn Group, Queensland, Australia. Subsequently reported from eastern Papua New Guinea and Fiji.

References

Discodorididae
Gastropods described in 1932